KADA (1230 AM, "Pirate Radio 102.3") is a radio station broadcasting a modern rock format. Licensed to Ada, Oklahoma, United States, the station (and its sister stations, KADA-FM 99.3, KYKC 100.1, KCNP 89.5, KXFC 105.5, and KTLS 106.5) are owned by The Chickasaw Nation.

History 
KADA was a charter member of the Oklahoma Network when it was formed in 1937.

On January 1, 2018, KADA changed their format from sports to active rock, branded as "Pirate Radio 102.3" (simulcast on FM translator K272FW 102.3 FM Ada).

Translators

Notable programs
10:15 Club, with disc jockey Dan Owen (Owens), 1950
Homemakers Music, with disc jockey Monte Bell, 1949–1954
Just for Ladies, with disc jockey Betty Hughes Nolen, 1950
Melody Roundup, with disc jockey Dan Owen (Owens), 1948
Mystery Matinee, with disc jockey George P. Miller, 1949
Songs of Range Capers, with disc jockey Bill Little, 1947
Songs of the Range, with disc jockey Monte Bell, 1949–1954
The Old Gold Review, with Rick Cody
Trading Post

Notable on-air personalities
Douglas Edwards - Newscaster - 1950s
Monte Bell, sportscaster, 1951–1954
Hilary Fry, newscaster, 1942
Frank Hawkinson, newscaster, 1939
Lillard Hill - newscaster, 1942
Weldon Stomps - newscaster, 1942.
Berry Bell 1972-1975
John Williams - 1973-1976
Roger Harris 1978 - present
Rick Cody - 1978 - 1992
J.Robert Beck - 1981-1983
Craig Miller - 1983-1986
Jeff Tyler - 1983-1988
Mike Hall 1968-present

General Managers 

 Jerry Spencer
 Bill Huddleston - 1978-1984
 Roger Harris - 1984 to present

References

External links
Pirate Radio 102.3 Twitter

ADA
Native American radio
Chickasaw
Radio stations established in 1946
Ada, Oklahoma
1946 establishments in Oklahoma
Modern rock radio stations in the United States